Atene Kalolo is the First Lady of Tokelau and is President of the Atafu Women's Council. In 2019, she gave the opening speech at a summit in Tokelau aimed at empowering women to enter politics. She is married to the Ulu o Tokelau, Kelihiano Kalolo. They have two sons, one daughter and fifteen grand-children.

References 

Tokelauan politicians
First Ladies of Tokelau
Living people
New Zealand women's rights activists
Year of birth missing (living people)